Darsamand is a big village in tehsil tall under district Hangu. According to one survey Darsamand village is one of the biggest village on whole Pakistan as its boundaries starts from Jawar Ghudi till Mamo Banda and surroundings and union council of Hangu District in the Khyber Pakhtunkhwa province of Pakistan. It is located at 33°26'16N 70°39'48E and has an altitude of 889 metres (2919 feet).

There was an old railway station at Darsamand Jandhi but it is no longer in use.

Most of the Darsamand people are from the Bangash tribe.

References

Union councils of Hangu District
Populated places in Hangu District, Pakistan